Billy Hampson (26 August 1882 – 24 February 1966) was an English football player and manager.

Hampson was born in Radcliffe, Lancashire and was the brother of footballers Tommy and Walker Hampson. He played for Rochdale, Bury and Norwich City before moving to Newcastle United for £1,250 in January 1914. However, before Hampson could properly settle at the club, war broke out later that year and Newcastle closed St James' Park. Hampson was determined to continue playing, and joined Leeds City as a 'guest' player during the war. He was a regular, turning out in 91 matches between December 1916 and April 1919 and helping them to win the unofficial title of League Champions in 1918.

Hampson was 37 years old when the war ended and he returned to Newcastle; his place in the first team had gone to an older player, Billy McCracken. Hampson pledged to fight for a first team place; he was returned to his former place when McCracken left in 1923 to manage Hull City. He went on to become the oldest FA Cup finalist ever when at 41 years and eight months he appeared in the 1924 Final, Newcastle beat Aston Villa 2–0.

He stayed at Newcastle for the next three years, before leaving for nearby South Shields in September 1927. He continued playing until March 1930, when he retired from play at the age of 47. Later that month, he took over as manager of lowly Carlisle United. His time at the club was largely unsuccessful as the team finished 15th and conceded 101 goals in his first campaign. However, he did unearth two footballing gems in Bill Shankly and Bob Batey, who went on to have excellent reputations. He left the club in May 1933.

He had a short stint in charge of Ashington back in the north-east before taking over from Dick Ray as manager of Leeds United in March 1935. They finished 18th at the end of his first season in charge. Hampson felt the team needed experienced players which prompted him to sign former England internationals, goalkeeper Albert McInroy and forward George Brown, in the summer. The signings did not prove to have a great effect on the club's fortunes, but they consolidated their First Division status in the few years before World War II. They avoided relegation by just two points in 1936–37. Hampson began to develop a lot of young players, leading to Leeds' only Central League win that same season. He was also known for scouting Ireland for young players. His squad generally consisted of both youth and experience but by the time football officially restarted after the war, in 1946–47, these players were well past their best. Hampson stood by his pre-war squad which proved to be the downfall.

Leeds had a dreadful season, with only one point taken away from Elland Road and just six victories all year. They finished bottom with eighteen points – fifteen points away from safety. Hampson resigned soon after the relegation and was replaced by former Leeds player Willis Edwards in April 1947. Hampton continued working at the club until October of that year as the chief scout, before coaching in schools football.

In total, Hampson held the post of Leeds United manager for 12 years. However, as that period spanned the Second World War, he was only in charge for five seasons of official football.

On 24 February 1966, Billy Hampson died of a heart attack.

References

External links
Full Managerial Stats for Leeds United from WAFLL

1882 births
1966 deaths
English football managers
English footballers
Newcastle United F.C. players
Rochdale A.F.C. players
Bury F.C. players
Norwich City F.C. players
South Shields F.C. (1889) players
English Football League players
Carlisle United F.C. managers
Ashington A.F.C. managers
Leeds United F.C. managers
English Football League managers
People from Radcliffe, Greater Manchester
Place of death missing
Association football fullbacks
FA Cup Final players